Leah Chishugi is a Tutsi survivor of the Rwandan genocide, author and humanitarian. She is the founder of the charity Everything is a Benefit, which campaigns on behalf of the survivors of the victims of rape and other human rights abuses during the first and second civil conflicts in the Democratic Republic of the Congo (DRC).

Chishugi, who has nine siblings, was at Kigali airport on 6 April 1994 when the president Juvénal Habyarimana, was assassinated

Chishugi, who currently resides in London and works as a nurse, grew up in Goma, a city in the DRC, just inside the border with Rwanda. When she was seventeen she moved to Rwanda and married, and gave birth to a son. In 1994 she fled the genocide which was occurring in Rwanda at the time and went to Britain as a refugee. In 2008 she returned home to deliver food and medicine, and appalled by what she found, she began to interview survivors of rape in the villages she visited. Chishugi hired transport in Bukavu and then traveled to Walungu, when the road became impossible to use she walked. She has said that "The forests were littered with corpses" and over a two-month period she interviewed roughly 500 survivors of rape. She documented the ages, names and locations of where attacks had occurred, as well as the ethnicity of the perpetrators. The youngest survivor she documented was one year old, and the eldest was ninety.

In 2010 she wrote, A Long Way From Paradise: Surviving The Rwandan Genocide which is a recounting of her escape from the genocide.

References

Bibliography

 

1976 births
Living people
Rwandan genocide
Democratic Republic of the Congo activists
Democratic Republic of the Congo women activists
21st-century Democratic Republic of the Congo people